India competed at the 2020 Summer Olympics in Tokyo, Japan. Originally scheduled to take place from 24 July to 9 August 2020, the games were postponed to 23 July to 8 August 2021, due to the COVID-19 pandemic. India has appeared in every edition of the Summer Olympics since 1920, although it made its official debut at the 1900 Summer Olympics in Paris. The nation sent its largest-ever contingent of 126 competitors to the 2020 Games. To date, the 2020 Summer Olympics are the most successful Games for India since its first regular Olympics appearance in 1920, with Indian Olympians winning 7 medals (1 gold, 2 silver and 4 bronze). The Indian contingent participated in a record 69 events, and earned medals across 18 athletic disciplines. 

In the men's javelin throw, Neeraj Chopra won India's first-ever gold medal in athletics, the nation's second ever individual gold and first individual gold since the Beijing 2008 Olympics, won by Abhinav Bindra (Shooting). This was also India's first athletics medal since its first Olympics appearance as an independent nation in 1948, and its third overall after Norman Pritchard's silver medals in 1900. Saikhom Mirabai Chanu won India's first-ever silver in women's weightlifting (49 kg), becoming the first Indian Olympic medallist in the sport since 2000. P. V. Sindhu won a bronze in women's badminton to become the first Indian female athlete and second Indian to win two consecutive Olympic medals in individual events (having won a silver medal in 2016). The men's national field hockey team won the bronze medal, their first Olympic medal since 1980. The men's 4 x 400m relay team set a new Asian record of 3:00.25. Aditi Ashok in women's golf and Deepak Punia in men's freestyle wrestling (86 kg) both placed fourth in final rankings, as did the women's national field hockey team, which achieved its best performance since its Olympics debut in 1980.

Medalists

Competitors

Archery

Three Indian archers qualified for the men's events by reaching the quarterfinal stage of the men's team recurve at the 2019 World Archery Championships in 's-Hertogenbosch, Netherlands. Another Indian archer scored a shoot-off victory in the quarterfinal round of the women's individual recurve to book one of three available spots at the 2019 Asian Championships in Bangkok, Thailand.

The full Indian archery squad was officially announced on 8 March 2021, with veteran Tarundeep Rai and world-number-nine seed Deepika Kumari slated to shoot at their third Olympics.

Athletics

Indian athletes further achieved the entry standards, either by reaching the qualifying marks or by world ranking, in the following track and field events (up to a maximum of 3 athletes in each event):

Track & road events
Men

Women

Mixed

Field events

Badminton

India entered four badminton players for each of the following events into the Olympic tournament based on the BWF World Race to Tokyo Rankings; one entry each in the men's and women's singles and a pair in the men's doubles.

Boxing 

India entered nine boxers (five men and four women) into the Olympic tournament. Two-time Olympian Vikas Krishan Yadav (men's welterweight), 2014 Asian Games bronze medalists Satish Kumar Yadav (men's super heavyweight) and reigning Asian champion Pooja Rani (women's middleweight), London 2012 bronze medalist and six-time world champion Mary Kom (women's flyweight), 2019 world silver medalist Amit Panghal (men's flyweight), and 2018 Commonwealth Games runner-up Manish Kaushik, along with Ashish Kumar (men's middleweight), Simranjit Kaur (women's lightweight), and reigning world championship bronze medalist Lovlina Borgohain (women's welterweight), secured the spots on the Indian squad in their respective weight divisions, either by advancing to the semifinal match or by scoring a box-off triumph, at the 2020 Asia & Oceania Qualification Tournament in Amman, Jordan.

Men

Women

Equestrian

India entered one eventing rider into the Olympic equestrian competition for the first time in two decades, by finishing in the top two, outside the group selection, of the individual FEI Olympic rankings for Group G (Southeast Asia and Oceania).

Eventing

Fencing

India entered one fencer for the first time into the Olympic competition. C. A. Bhavani Devi claimed a spot in the women's sabre as one of the two highest-ranked fencers vying for qualification from Asia and Oceania in the FIE Adjusted Official Rankings and became the first Indian fencer to qualify for olympic games.

Field hockey

Summary

Men's tournament

India men's national field hockey team qualified for the Olympics by securing one of the seven tickets available and defeating Russia in a playoff at the Bhubaneswar leg of the 2019 FIH Olympic Qualifiers. 

Team roster

Group play

Quarterfinal

Semifinal

Bronze medal game

Women's tournament

India women's national field hockey team qualified for the Olympics by securing one of the seven tickets available and defeating the United States in a playoff at the Bhubaneswar leg of the 2019 FIH Olympic Qualifiers. 

Team roster

Group play

Quarterfinal

Semifinal

Bronze medal game

Golf

India entered two male and one female golfer into the Olympic tournament. Anirban Lahiri,  Udayan Mane and Aditi Ashok are qualified directly among the top 60 eligible players for the men's and women's event.

On 28 July 2021, Indian golfer Diksha Dagar received an invitation from the International Golf Federation to complete in the women's individual event at the 2020 Summer Olympics following a late withdrawal of South African golfer Paula Reto.

Gymnastics

Artistic
India entered one artistic gymnast into the Olympic competition. With the cancellation of the 2021 Asian Championships in Hangzhou, China, Pranati Nayak secured the last of two available places in the women's individual all-around, as the next highest-ranked gymnast vying for qualification from her continent at the  2019 World Artistic Gymnastics Championships in Stuttgart, Germany.

Women

Judo

India entered one female judoka into the Olympic tournament based on the International Judo Federation Olympics Individual Ranking.

Rowing

India qualified one boat in the men's lightweight double sculls for the Games by winning the silver medal and securing the first of three berths available at the 2021 FISA Asia & Oceania Olympic Qualification Regatta in Tokyo, Japan. 

Qualification Legend: FA=Final A (medal); FB=Final B (non-medal); FC=Final C (non-medal); FD=Final D (non-medal); FE=Final E (non-medal); FF=Final F (non-medal); SA/B=Semifinals A/B; SC/D=Semifinals C/D; SE/F=Semifinals E/F; QF=Quarterfinals; R=Repechage

Sailing

Indian sailors qualified one boat in each of the following classes through the 2018 Sailing World Championships, the class-associated Worlds, the 2018 Asian Games, and the continental regattas, marking the country's return to the sport for the first time since 2008.

M = Medal race EL = Eliminated – did not advance into the medal race  * = Discarded race not counted in the overall result

Shooting

Indian shooters achieved quota places for the following events by virtue of their best finishes at the 2018 ISSF World Championships, the 2019 ISSF World Cup series, and the 2019 Asian Championship, as long as they obtained a minimum qualifying score (MQS) by May 31, 2020.

On 5 April 2021, National Rifle Association of India (NRAI) officially announced a squad of fourteen Indian shooters for the rescheduled Games, including the reigning Commonwealth Games champion Manu Bhaker, Asian Games gold medalists Saurabh Chaudhary and Rahi Sarnobat in the pistol events, rifle marksman and two-time Olympian Sanjeev Rajput (2008 and 2012), and the current world-number-one Divyansh Singh Panwar and Elavenil Valarivan in the men's and women's air rifle, respectively. With a double starter (owned by Bhaker) securing quota places in two women's pistol events, NRAI opted to exchange the women's 25 m pistol (won by Chinki Yadav) for an additional place in the women's 50 m rifle 3 positions, eventually awarded to Anjum Moudgil.

Men

Women

Mixed

Swimming

Sajan Prakash and Srihari Natraj became the first-ever Indian swimmers to qualify for the Olympic Games by breaching the A standard time. Maana Patel received entry via Universality Invitation.

Table tennis

India entered four athletes into the table tennis competition at the Games. Sathiyan Gnanasekaran and Sutirtha Mukherjee scored the zonal-match triumphs for the South Asia zone to secure one of the five available places each in the men's and women's singles, while three-time Olympian Sharath Kamal Achanta and 2018 Commonwealth Games champion Manika Batra notched the remaining spots on the Indian team, as the highest-ranked eligible table tennis players across all regional zones, at the Asian Qualification Tournament in Doha, Qatar.

Tennis

India entered two athletes into tennis by using Sania Mirza's protected ranking of 9 in women's doubles category.  Sumit Nagal qualified for men's singles after several players withdrew resulted due to a positive COVID-19 test or personal reasons.

Weightlifting

India entered one female weightlifter into the Olympic competition. Rio 2016 Olympian Saikhom Mirabai Chanu finished second of the eight highest-ranked weightlifters in the women's 49 kg category based on the IWF Absolute World Rankings.

Wrestling 

India qualified eight wrestlers for each of the following classes into the Olympic competition. Four of them finished among the top six to book Olympic spots in the men's freestyle (57, 65 and 86 kg) and women's freestyle 53 kg at the 2019 World Championships, while two additional licenses were awarded to the Indian wrestlers, who progressed to the top two finals of the women's freestyle 57 and 62 kg, respectively, at the 2021 Asian Qualification Tournament in Almaty, Kazakhstan. Two Indian wrestlers claimed one of the remaining slots each in the men's freestyle 125 kg and women's freestyle 50 kg, respectively, to complete the nation's roster at the 2021 World Qualification Tournament in Sofia, Bulgaria.

Freestyle wrestler (125 kg) Sumit Malik was disqualified and the quota place he had claimed was stripped off following a positive doping test, hence leaving India with a total of seven wrestlers in the contingent.

Freestyle

See also
 India at the 2020 Summer Paralympics
 India at the Olympics

References

Nations at the 2020 Summer Olympics
2020
2021 in Indian sport